Wilson Baker FRS (24 January 1900 – 3 June 2002) was a British organic chemist.

He was born in Runcorn, the youngest of the four children of Harry and Mary Baker (née Eccles); his father was himself a chemist, having studied under Sir Henry Enfield Roscoe and Robert Bunsen, amongst others. Wilson entered Victoria University of Manchester at the age of 16, and (having spent some time in France as a Quaker volunteer during the First World War) graduated top of the honours class in 1921. He then undertook a M.Sc. with Arthur Lapworth, before doing a Ph.D. with Sir Robert Robinson on the synthesis of isoflavones. This was awarded in 1924.

In 1927 he married Juliet Elizabeth Glaisyer, and was appointed by William Henry Perkin, Jr. to the Dyson Perrins Laboratory in Oxford, where he remained until 1944. Late that year, he was appointed to the Alfred Capper Pass Chair of Organic Chemistry at the University of Bristol, where he remained until his retirement in 1965. In his memory, a Wilson Baker lecture is hosted by the chemistry department in Bristol every year.

Wilson Baker's early research interests were in plant pigments, like Robinson's, but he also worked on the chemistry of Penicillin during the war, and had interest in non-benzenoid aromatic hydrocarbons. The Baker-Venkataraman rearrangement is named after him and K. Venkataraman.

A committed Quaker, during his time in Oxford, he became concerned with efforts being made for famine relief in Greece during World War II.  He was a member of the Oxford Committee for Famine Relief which applied for funding under the War Charities Act 1940, and which later developed into the charity Oxfam.

References

Alumni of the University of Manchester
English chemists
Fellows of the Royal Society
Organic chemists
Fellows of The Queen's College, Oxford
Academics of the University of Bristol
English Quakers
1900 births
2002 deaths
British centenarians
Men centenarians
People from Runcorn